Phaedon is a Greek given name. It can also be transliterated as Phaedo, Fedon, or Faidon.

The meaning of Phaedon comes from the Greek words "φαι>φη>φως" which means "light" and "διδοναι>δων" which means "giving", so it could be translated as "he who gives light". Notable people with the name include:

Phaedon or Phaedo of Elis (4th century BC), ancient Greek philosopher
Phaedon Avouris (born 1945), Greek chemical physicist
Phaedon Georgitsis (1939-2019), Greek cinema actor
Phaedon Gizikis (1917–1999), Greek general who was President of Greece from 1973 to 1974

See also
Pheidon, an Argive ruler during the 7th century BCE
Phedon Papamichael (born 1962), a Greek cinematographer and film director
Faidon Matthaiou (1924–2011), Greek rower, basketball coach, and basketball player
Phaedon-Anninos Cavalieratos, representative of Greece to NATO 1967-1972

Greek masculine given names